Serhiy Dikhtiar (transliterated also as Serhij Dychtjar or Sergej Dichtiar;  born 26 August 1975) is a Ukrainian former professional football midfielder who spent all of his professional career playing in Germany.

References

External links
 
 

Living people
1975 births
Association football midfielders
Ukrainian footballers
FC Dynamo Kyiv players
FC Schalke 04 players
SG Wattenscheid 09 players
1. FC Saarbrücken players
SV Meppen players
Bundesliga players
2. Bundesliga players
Ukrainian expatriate footballers
Expatriate footballers in Germany
Ukrainian expatriate sportspeople in Germany